Servite High School is a private, Catholic, all-boys college preparatory high school operated by the Order of Servants of Mary in Anaheim, California. It was founded in 1958. 

As of 2017 it had about 9000 alumni. Its mascot is the Friar and its colors are black and white, trimmed with gold. It is located within the Diocese of Orange; however, it is not a diocesan school, but is run privately by the Servite Order itself.

History
in 1958, the Servites responded to an invitation by the Roman Catholic Archdiocese of Los Angeles to open a school, teaching the first classes at nearby St. Philip Benizi Elementary School until the first building was completed. The main building was officially dedicated on February 12, 1959. Major expansions since then include a gym and aquatics facilities (in 1967), theater (1977), new classrooms (1984), and new science and library facility (1998). Servite's wrestling room was also a recent addition to the school on the campus' priory lawn (2006). A new parking lot, dedicated to former dean Tim O'Hara was added for more faculty parking. (2016)

Admissions
Admission to Servite is based on academic transcripts, entrance examination, activities, arts and athletics.  The admissions process includes a review of academic transcripts; entrance examination; interview of parents and (separately) the student; letters of recommendation from teachers; participation in activities, community service, arts and/or athletics; and letters of recommendation from alumni or parents.

Servite has an Early Admission Process that enables young men to apply as early as October of their 8th grade year.  Upon completion of the admission process and receipt of the first set of grades for their 8th grade year, students may be admitted to Servite as early as November of their 8th grade year.

Connected schools
Servite's sister school is Rosary Academy, Fullerton, an all-girls Catholic institution. It also had a similar relationship with Cornelia Connelly High School in Anaheim before it closed in 2020.

Servite also has exchange programs with Servite schools around the world including Collège Notre-Dame des Servites (Ayer's Cliff, Quebec), Servite College (Perth, Western Australia), Blanche de Castille (Villemomble, France), Marian High School (Omaha, Nebraska), San Pelligrino (Misano, Italy), and Mary Star of the Sea (Zululand, South Africa).

Curriculum
In 2007, Servite implemented a student leadership program by dividing the student body into 8 student-led communities called "Priories" and 48 smaller student-led homeroom communities. Each week, a block period is dedicated to student-led leadership activities. The Priories are based on the Seven Holy Founders, and St. Philip Benizi.

The school is known for its academic curriculum, sports tradition, performing and visual fine arts programs (including courses in classical guitar and jazz band). The motto Credo ut Intelligam ("I believe so I may understand") illustrates the emphasis the school places on developing leaders who are faith-filled men of God. The academic curriculum has a wide variety of courses, including College Prep (CP), Honors Placement (HP), and Advanced Placement (AP) courses.

All courses offered at Servite High School are designed for the college- and university-bound student. For graduation from Servite High School all students are required to complete 270 academic credits. All required courses in all disciplines must be passed and no student may graduate from Servite with an unredeemed 'F' on his transcript. In addition to credit requirements, no ‘F’ policy, and Christian service hours, there are also specific course requirements. Students must also complete a minimum of 156 hours of community service to graduate.

Athletics

State championships
 Football: 1982, 2009
 Basketball: 1990
 Golf: 2011
 Cross Country: 2004
 Soccer: 2015, 2020

Fine arts
Servite High School offers arts courses including Classical Guitar, Choir, Concert Band, Jazz Band, and Visual Arts such as Drawing, and Painting. Servite offers Fundamentals of Theatre as an elective, and many extracurricular classes partnering with Rosary including: acting, musical theatre, technical theatre, playwriting, directing, and dance.

Notable alumni

 Steve Beuerlein (1983), Notre Dame and NFL quarterback
 Derek Brown (1989), NFL running back
 Steve Buechele (1979), MLB third baseman
 Patrick Cantlay (2010), professional golfer
 Dale A. Drozd (1973), United States district judge of the United States District Court for the Eastern District of California and former Chief United States Magistrate Judge of the same court.
 Sean Estrada (2003), University of Pennsylvania and San Francisco 49ers offensive lineman NFL Attorney for Labor Relations
 Cody Fajardo (2010), quarterback for University of Nevada and CFL's Saskatchewan Roughriders
 Ben Francisco (1999), MLB outfielder for Philadelphia Phillies, Cleveland Indians
 Chris Galippo (2007), middle linebacker at USC and US Army Bowl MVP
 Ryan Garko (1999), MLB first baseman for Seattle Mariners, college baseball coach
 A. J. Gass (1993), former CFL football player
 Dennis Sean Houlton (1997), Major League Baseball pitcher
 Cole Irvin (2012), MLB pitcher for the Oakland Athletics
 Frank Kalil (1977), NFL and USFL center
 Ryan Kalil (2003), offensive lineman at USC, starting center for Carolina Panthers, author, filmmaker
 Matt Kalil (2008), offensive tackle for USC and Carolina Panthers
 Craig A. Kelly (1972), Ambassador of the United States to Chile
 Brian Lee (1989), entrepreneur, founder LegalZoom.com, Shoedazzle.com and The Honest Company
 Rex Lee (1987), actor, Entourage
 James D. McCaffrey (1970), software research and author
 Mike McDonald (1983), comedian, actor
 Richard McWilliam (1971), founder of Upper Deck Company
 Matt Moran (1980), NFL offensive tackle and high school football coach
 Troy Niklas (2011), tight end for Notre Dame and NFL's Arizona Cardinals
 Blaine Nye (1964), former NFL offensive lineman, and economics consultant
 Chris Pontius, (2005) soccer player, D.C. United midfielder
 Michael A. Rice (1973), university professor and Rhode Island state representative
 Mike Robertson (1987), former MLB first baseman and left fielder
 Marc Rzepczynski (2003), Major League Baseball pitcher for Seattle Mariners
 Vincent Bevins (2002), journalist for Washington Post, LA Times and Financial Times
 Joseph Sanberg (1997), founder CalEITC4Me and co-founder, Aspiration.com
 Turk Schonert (1975), Stanford and NFL quarterback, Buffalo Bills offensive coordinator
 Zach Shallcross (2014), star of season 27 of The Bachelor
 Matt Slater (2003), captain and wide receiver for New England Patriots
 Keith Taylor (2017), cornerback for the Carolina Panthers
 Kurt Vollers (1997), former NFL tackle
 Patrick Warburton, (1982) actor (did not graduate; transferred out)
 Ed Whelan, (1978), American lawyer, legal activist, and political commentator.
 Matt Willis (2002), wide receiver for UCLA and Denver Broncos
 Mike Witt (1978), MLB pitcher, pitched perfect game September 30, 1984 for California Angels

References

External links
 Servite High School Official Site
 Servite Priory Website
 ServiteFootball.com

Boys' schools in the United States
Educational institutions established in 1957
Catholic secondary schools in California
Catholic preparatory schools in California
Roman Catholic Diocese of Orange
Servite schools
High schools in Anaheim, California
1957 establishments in California